Saviečiai (formerly) is a village in Kėdainiai district municipality, in Kaunas County, in central Lithuania. According to the 2011 census, the village had a population of 141 people. There is a cemetery.

History
In the beginning of the 20th century Saviečiai was an okolica.

During the Soviet era, Saviečiai was subsidiary settlement of the "Spike" kolkhoz.

Demography

References

Villages in Kaunas County
Kėdainiai District Municipality